NBC SportsTalk was a daily sports talk show on American television channel NBCSN named after the various talk sites on the NBCSports.com. It was the flagship show for the network.

History
NBC SportsTalk launched on September 8, 2011, before the NFL kickoff special in 2011. It competed directly with the 6 p.m. edition of ESPN's SportsCenter. Repeats were aired along the late night.

The original anchor was Russ Thaler, later replaced by Erik Kuselias.

The show asked for input from viewers via Twitter and had its own app for the iOS and Android operating system. Russ Thaler would usually read 1−2 tweets right before the end of each broadcast.

From January 30 − February 3, 2012 the show aired live episodes from Indianapolis, the site of Super Bowl XLVI.

The show is last aired On February 1, 2013, and its slot has been replaced by The Crossover.

Notable personalities and guests

Ben Maller (Radio Host)
Erik Kuselias (Host)
Peter King (Football Insider)
Mike Florio (Football Insider)
Bob Costas (Sports Analyst)
Rodney Harrison (Football Analyst)
Brian Engblom (Hockey Analyst)
Keith Jones (Hockey Analyst)
Jeremy Roenick (Hockey Analyst)
Pierre McGuire (Hockey Analyst)
Amani Toomer (Football Analyst)
Keith Bulluck (Football Analyst)
Pete Najarian (Football Analyst)
Ross Tucker (Football Analyst)
Seth Everett (Baseball Analyst)
Shaun King (Football Analyst)
Adrian Wojnarowski (Basketball Insider)
Bobby Gonzalez (College Basketball Analyst)
Amy K. Nelson (Baseball Analyst)
Arlo White (Soccer Analyst)
Tom Brennan (College Basketball Analyst)

Many athletes, coaches and managers have also been on the show including: Tony Romo, Kevin Love, Dan Wheldon (before his death), Torrey Smith, Scott Fujita, Maurice Jones-Drew, Dale Earnhardt Jr., Matt Barkley, Reggie Bush, Matthew Stafford, Tim Tebow, Cam Newton, Larry Fitzgerald, Victor Cruz, Joe Montana, Misty May-Treanor, Brandon Jacobs, Carl Banks, Michael Phelps, Kyrie Irving, Tyler Zeller, Vince Young, Ugo Ihemelu, Kenny Cooper, Sedrick Ellis, Steve Nash, George Wilson, Zdeno Chára, Jared Allen, Dario Franchitti, Hélio Castroneves, Eli Manning, Clayton Kershaw, Arian Foster, Adam LaRoche, Jason Babin, Carmelo Anthony, Joe Mauer, Josh Hamilton, Chipper Jones, Donovan McNabb, Ben Watson (NFL Player), Ndamukong Suh, John Elway, Ryan Fitzpatrick, Brandon Moore, Aaron Rodgers, Charles Barkley, Steve Kerr, Peyton Manning, Terence Newman, Will Power, Ryan Hunter-Reay, Brandon Phillips, Matt Kalil, Ray Lewis, Manny Pacquiao, David Wright, Terry Francona, Bruce Bochy, Bryant Jennings and Warren Moon.

References

NBCSN shows
2011 American television series debuts
2013 American television series endings
2010s American television talk shows